The Nordnes Park is a public park in the municipality of Bergen in Vestland county, Norway. The park is located near the centre of the city of Bergen on the northwestern end of the Nordnes peninsula. It was established in 1888-1898 after an initiative from Edvard G. Johannessen in Det nyttige Selskab.

The Bergen Aquarium and the headquarters of the Norwegian Institute of Marine Research are both located on the grounds of the park.

The city of Bergen and the city of Seattle are sister cities, and in 1970, Seattle sent a totem pole to Bergen to celebrate the city's 900th anniversary.  The totem pole was erected in the Nordnes Park.

References

Parks in Bergen